Brown's Manor is a historic house at 115 High Street in Ipswich, Massachusetts.  It is a -story Second Empire structure, with brick walls decorated with wooden trim, and a mansard roof pierced by segmented-arch dormers.  The building corners have white-painted wood quoining, and the front entrance, set in a round-arch opening, is sheltered by a porch supported by grouped paneled columns.  The house was built about 1886, probably by George Brown, who purchased the property that year.  Brown was from a family known locally for its house-building skills.

The house was listed on the National Register of Historic Places in 1980.

See also
National Register of Historic Places listings in Ipswich, Massachusetts
National Register of Historic Places listings in Essex County, Massachusetts

References

Houses in Ipswich, Massachusetts
National Register of Historic Places in Ipswich, Massachusetts
Houses on the National Register of Historic Places in Essex County, Massachusetts